Brett Stephen Basanez (born May 11, 1983) is a former American football quarterback. He was signed by the Carolina Panthers as an undrafted free agent in 2006. He played college football at Northwestern. Basanez was also a member of the Chicago Bears.

Early years
Basanez played high school football at St. Viator in Arlington Heights.  He participated in the first ever U.S. Army All-American Bowl game in 2000.

College career
Basanez played college football at Northwestern University in Evanston, Illinois, where he holds many school records for passing categories, including passing yards (10,580) and total offense (11,576). Basanez ranks 13th on the NCAA's all-time list for total offense, and 28th on the all-time list for passing yards. He was close to becoming the only player in NCAA history with 10,000 passing yards and 1,000 rushing yards (Basanez picked up 996 yards on the ground while at NU). He set two Sun Bowl records in the 2005 Sun Bowl: 38 completions and total offense of 448 yards.  His 50 attempts in the game are tied for second, with Kyle Orton and Byron Leftwich in all-time bowls, trailing only Mike Kafka, another Northwestern Wildcat QB.

School records
Career
Total Offense (11,576)
Passing Attempts (1,584)
Passing Completions (913)
Passing Yards (10,580)
Passing Touchdowns (44) (ties record)
Wins (22)
Games Passing for 200 Yards (26)
Games Passing for 300 Yards (10)
Games Passing for 400 Yards (3)
Consecutive Games Passing for 200 Yards (10)
Consecutive Games Passing for 300 Yards (5)

Single season
Total Offense (4,045) 2005
Passing Attempts (497) 2005
Passing Completions (314) 2005
Passing Yards (3,622) 2005
Passing Touchdowns (21)
Passing Yards Gained in Two Consecutive Games (824) 2005
Passing Yards Gained in Three Consecutive Games (1,155) 2005
Passing Yards Gained in Four Consecutive Games (1,481) 2005
Passing Yards Gained in Five Consecutive Games (1,819) 2005
Games Passing for 200 Yards (11) 2005
Games Passing for 300 Yards (7) 2005
Consecutive Games Passing for 200 Yards (9) 2005
Consecutive Games Passing for 300 Yards (5) 2005
Passing Efficiency Rating (135.1) 2005
Passing Completion Percentage (.632) 2005

Single game
Total Offense (548) vs. TCU, 2004
Passing TD's in a Half (3) vs. TCU, 2004 (ties record)
Passing Completion Percentage (.806, 25-of-31) vs. Illinois, 2005

Statistics

Source:

Professional career

Carolina Panthers
Basanez was signed by the Carolina Panthers as an undrafted free agent following the 2006 NFL Draft on May 1, 2006. He was waived on September 2 and re-signed to the practice squad on September 3. He was promoted to the active roster on December 10.

Basanez suffered a hand injury prior to the start of the 2007 season and was placed on injured reserve on August 28, 2007, ending his season.

He was released on August 30, 2008 during final roster cuts and re-signed to the practice squad on September 3.

Chicago Bears
Basanez was signed by the Chicago Bears in February 2009 to a two-year contract. He was waived on September 5 and re-signed to the practice squad on September 6. He was promoted to the active roster on December 30. He was waived/injured on May 19, 2010, and reverted to injured reserve. He was released from injured reserve with an injury settlement on September 12, 2010.

Statistics

Source:

References

External links
 Northwestern profile
 

1983 births
Living people
American football quarterbacks
Carolina Panthers players
Chicago Bears players
Northwestern Wildcats football players
People from Arlington Heights, Illinois
Players of American football from Illinois